Alef-Laam Khomeini is a book written by Hedayatollah Behboudi, which is regarding the biography of Iran's 1st/former supreme leader, Seyyed Ruhollah Khomeini. This book was published by the institute of "Motale'at wa Pazhuheshhaye Siasi" (political studies and researches) in 2018; and has obtained Jalal Al-e Ahmad Literary Award, and also Iran's Book of the Year Awards.

The book is a comprehensive piece on the life of Ayatollah Ruhollah Khomeini. The book starts with the introduction of Khomeini family and then the birth of Ruhollah Khomeini, his growth, basic education and then higher education.

Content

According to the reporter of IRIB News Agency, the most considerable point in regards to the book of "Alef Lam Khomeini" is that: diverse parts of the book has been written by submitting documents; and ... The mentioned book whose first edition was published in 1157 pages (in 18 chapters),
is commenced with the introduction of Seyyed Ruhollah Khomeini's family, and it pursues the movement of Khomeini's life since his birth, ... , schooling in his birthplace, his education in Arak, and immigration to the seminary of Qom. This biography book can be divided into two general sections:

 The first section, is concerning the scientific life of Seyyed Ruhollah Khomeini in Qom --including more than 40 years of his life; it is also mentioned that: During these four decades of his lifetime, he studied, taught, wrote; he likewise trained students and (religious/politic) charters.

 The second section of this biography is concerning the politic life of Seyyed Ruhollah Khomeini that was commenced in 1962, and is connected to the victory of "Islamic movement" in 1979 -- by passing diverse ups and downs of the age.

Literary award(s)
The book of "Alef Lam Khomeini" earned "Jalal Al-e Ahmad Literary Awards" in 2018 at documentary section. This book, also won (35th) Iran's Book of the Year Awards at the section of documentary.

See also

 Sharh-e Esm (book)
 Seyyed Ruhollah Khomeini, in Childhood

References

2018 non-fiction books
Clergy
iranian biographies
Ruhollah Khomeini
Iranian books
Shia Islam
Persian-language books